Chesterfield County Public Libraries (CCPL) is a public library system in Chesterfield County, Virginia. The system contains 10 branches across the county, with the main branch being located at the Chesterfield County Government Complex.

Branches 
 Bon Air
 Central (Chesterfield)
 Chester
 Clover Hill
 Enon
 Ettrick-Matoaca
 LaPrade
 Meadowville
 Midlothian
 North Courthouse Road

References

External links 
 Chesterfield County Public Libraries

Library
Public libraries in Virginia
Chesterfield County, Virginia